The Cachoeira dos Patos Dam (}) is a proposed hydroelectric dam on the Jamanxim River in the state of Pará, Brazil.
Work has been delayed due to concern about environmental impact and lack of consultation with affected indigenous people.

Location

The Cachoeira dos Patos Dam is proposed to be built on the Jamanxim River in the state of Pará, in the Tapajós river basin.
It would be built in the municipality of Itaituba.
The hydroelectric power plant will be part of the proposed  Tapajós hydroelectric complex on the Tapajós and Jamanxim rivers.
Others are the São Luiz do Tapajós (6,133 MW), Jatobá (2,338 MW), Cachoeira do Cai (802 MW) and Jamanxim (881 MW), all under study, as well as the Jardim do Ouro (227 MW) and Chacorão (3,336 MW).

Technical

Estimated construction cost is US$829 million.

The project would be undertaken by a consortium of Eletrobras, Eletronorte, Construções e Comércio Camargo Côrrea, EDF Consultoria em Projetos de Geração de Energia, Endesa Brasil, EPP Energia Elétrica, Promoção e Participações, Intertechne Consultores Associados and Neoenergia Investimentos.
A "platform" approach is proposed for construction to minimise environmental impact.
There would be no access roads, and workers would be taken to the site by helicopter.
After construction is complete the site would be regenerated.

Impact

It would also affect the area around the Tapajós Environmental Protection Area and the South Amazon Ecotones Ecological Corridor.
A study released in December 2015 took into account carbon and methane emissions from the reservoir and from construction and concluded that there was a high probability that the plant would generate emissions comparable to a natural gas plant.

Licensing

Eletronorte, Camargo Corrêa and CNEC Engenharia undertook hydraulic inventory studies of the Tapajós and Jamanxim Rivers, which were approved by the National Electric Energy Agency (Aneel) in 2009. That year Aneel approved the start feasibility studies of the Cachoeira dos Patos, to be delivered on 31 July 2011.
The deadline was later extended to 31 December 2013.
On 29 July 2013 the Federal Public Ministry recommended suspension of licensing of the Cachoeira dos Patos hydroelectric plant for the same reasons as other planned hydroelectric plants on the Tapajós, Teles Pires, Jamanxim and Juruena rivers.
They had not undertaken an Integrated Environmental Assessment and had not consulted with the affected indigenous peoples, both legal requirements.
The Ministry of the Environment informed the Federal Public Ministry in Santarém on 20 September 2013 that it had suspended licensing.

Notes

Sources

Hydroelectric power stations in Brazil
Dams in Pará
Proposed hydroelectric power stations
Proposed renewable energy power stations in Brazil